Manhasset Bay, New York, is an embayment in western Long Island off Long Island Sound.

Description 
Manhasset Bay forms the northeastern boundary of the Great Neck Peninsula and the southwestern boundary of Cow Neck (Port Washington Peninsula or Manhasset Neck).  On the north side of the bay there are three points, Barkers Point at the entrance, Plum Point coming the furthest into the Bay, and Tom's Point in the back bay. On the other side, Hewlett Point forms the entrance nearly a mile from Barkers Point.  Hart Island lies in the Sound just outside the mouth of Manhasset Bay.

The Manhasset Bay area was likely first inhabited in the 17th century by the Matinecook tribe of Algonquin Indians. However, that view has been challenged. Then the Dutch and the English settled around the bay in the 17th century because of the proximity of fish. The Bay was called Schout's Bay by the Dutch, and then Howe's Bay by the English. Subsequently, due to the presence of cattle raising, it came to be called Cow Bay, and the local neck, to the northeast, "Cow Neck". It finally became Manhasset Bay in 1907.

In the 1920s it began to switch from the cow-and-fish industry to support services for commercial boating, as it is considered to be one of the best harbors on Long Island Sound with little tidal current except at the entrance and average tidal displacement of only six feet. By the 1980s it was full of marinas and yacht clubs. The Sands Point Seaplane Base on Manhasset Bay was at one time the main airport for passenger service between New York and Europe.  At the beginning of the 21st century, it had about 16% of all the marinas and yacht clubs in the whole of Long Island Sound.

Sub-watersheds 
Manhasset Bay's watershed consists of many smaller sub-water sheds. These sub-watersheds are:

 Barkers Point
 Baxter and Mill Pond
 Eastern Shore
 Kings Point Pond
 Leeds Pond
 Mitchell Creek
 Sheets Creek
 Southeastern Shore
 Southwestern Shore
 Toms and Plum Points
 Whitney Pond

Gallery

Notes

Bays of New York (state)
Bodies of water of Nassau County, New York
Long Island Sound
Town of North Hempstead, New York